Qeymas (also Romanized as Qeymās; also known as Kainas and Kāynas) is a village in Mahidasht Rural District, Mahidasht District, Kermanshah County, Kermanshah Province, Iran. At the 2006 census, its population was 134, in 36 families.

References 

Populated places in Kermanshah County